is a Japanese bureaucrat and politician who was a member of the Liberal Democratic Party (LDP). He was the minister of justice in 1999.

Career
Jinnouchi worked as a bureaucrat in the construction ministry. He was a member of the LDP and was first part of the faction headed by Keizo Obuchi. He then joined the faction led by Ryutaro Hashimoto in the party. Jinnouchi served in the Upper House for the LDP for three terms. He held the post of the parliamentary vice minister for agriculture, forestry, and fisheries.

He was appointed justice minister in the cabinet led by Prime Minister Keizo Obuchi. Jinnouchi succeeded Shozaburo Nakamura in the post who resigned from office due to giving permission for Arnold Schwarzenegger to enter the country without a passport. Jinnouchi's tenure ended on 5 October 1999 when Hideo Usui replaced him as justice minister.

References

External links

1933 births
Living people
Liberal Democratic Party (Japan) politicians
Members of the House of Councillors (Japan)
Ministers of Justice of Japan